Mary Catherine Crawford  (born 12 April 1947) is a former Australian politician. Born in Toowoomba, Queensland, she was educated at the University of Queensland before becoming a teacher. In 1987, she was elected to the Australian House of Representatives as the Labor member for Forde. On 25 March 1994 she was appointed Parliamentary Secretary to the Minister for Housing and Regional Development, a position she held until the defeat of the Keating Government in the 1996 election, in which Crawford lost her seat.  Crawford had previously held her seat with a fairly safe majority of 8.6 percent.  However, a redistribution ahead of the election pushed Forde into some rural, conservative-leaning territory in the Scenic Rim.  This wiped out Crawford's majority, reducing it to an extremely marginal 0.1 percent. Believing that this made Forde difficult—if not impossible—to hold, Crawford tried to transfer to the friendlier seat of Rankin, but was rebuffed by the party's organisational wing. She was defeated by Liberal Kay Elson on a nine-percent swing.

Crawford was made a Member of the Order of Australia in the 2020 Australia Day Honours for "significant service to women, and to the people and Parliament of Australia."

References

Australian Labor Party members of the Parliament of Australia
Members of the Australian House of Representatives for Forde
Members of the Australian House of Representatives
1947 births
Living people
Women members of the Australian House of Representatives
20th-century Australian politicians
Members of the Order of Australia
20th-century Australian women politicians
People from Toowoomba